Yamane (written: 山根) is a Japanese surname. Notable people with the surname include:

, Japanese manga artist
, Japanese women's footballer
, Japanese clothing designer
, Japanese violinist and composer
, Japanese footballer
, Japanese basketball coach
, Japanese mechanical designer
, Japanese singer
, Japanese video game composer and pianist
, Japanese footballer
, Japanese sport shooter
Ryan Yamane (born 1969), American politician
, Japanese politician
, Japanese Hagi Pottery Artisan
, Japanese women's ice hockey player
, Japanese photographer
, Japanese footballer
, Japanese swimmer

Fictional characters
, a character in the anime series Trickster
, a character in the manga series Major

Japanese-language surnames